= Thomas Lorman =

Thomas Anselm Lorman is a historian who studies Central Europe at SSEES.

== Works ==
- Lorman, Thomas (2006). Counter-revolutionary Hungary, 1920-1925: István Bethlen and the Politics of Consolidation. East European Monographs. ISBN 978-0-88033-594-2.
- Lorman, Thomas (2019). The Making of the Slovak People's Party: Religion, Nationalism and the Culture War in Early 20th-Century Europe. London: Bloomsbury Publishing. ISBN 978-1-350-10938-4.
